John Trumbull (April 24, 1750 – May 11, 1831) was an American poet.

Biography
Trumbull was born in what is now Watertown, Connecticut, where his father was a Congregational preacher. At the age of seven he passed his entrance examinations at Yale, but did not enter until 1763; he graduated in 1767, studied law there, and in 1771–1773 was a tutor (taking part in teaching and supervising the undergraduates).

While studying at Yale he had contributed in 1769–1770 ten essays, called "The Meddler", imitating The Spectator, to the Boston Chronicle, and in 1770 similar essays, signed " The Correspondent" to the Connecticut Journal and New Haven Post Boy. 

While a tutor he wrote his first satire in verse, The Progress of Dulness (1772–1773), an attack in three poems on educational methods of his time. His great poem, which ranks him with Philip Freneau and Francis Hopkinson as an American political satirist of the period of the War of Independence, was M'Fingal, of which the first canto, "The Town-Meeting", appeared in 1776 (dated 1775).
 In Canto IV, "The Vision," the last canto of M'Fingal, the Scottish background of the protagonist and accounts of the North Carolina Highlanders are featured, along with discrimination by the Whigs between Tories and the British soldiery. The mock epic presentation of the pageant of the war is evident in this canto, and the economic impact of the war is given its fullest treatment in the burlesque of the Ghost of Continental Money which ends the vision.

After the war Trumbull was a staunch Federalist, and with the "Hartford Wits" David Humphreys, Joel Barlow and Lemuel Hopkins, wrote The Anarchiad'''', a poem directed against the enemies of a firm central government. He was elected a Fellow of the American Academy of Arts and Sciences in 1791.

Works
 The Progress of Dulness (1772–73)
 M'Fingal (1775–82)
 The Poetical Works of John Trumbull, LLD

Commemoration 
 Trumbull Avenue in Detroit is named after him.
 John Trumbull Primary School in Watertown, CT
 M'Fingal Rd. in Watertown, CT was named after his poem.

References

Attribution
; Endnotes:
See the memoir in the Hartford edition of Trumbull's Poetical Works (2 vols., 1820)
James Hammond Trumbull's The Origin of “McFingal” (Morrisania, New York, 1868)
M. C. Tyler's Literary History of the American Revolution (New York 1897).

External links

 
 Brian Pelanda, Declarations of Cultural Independence: The Nationalistic Imperative Behind the Passage of Early American Copyright Laws, 1783-1787 58 Journal of the Copyright Society of the U.S.A. 431 (2011).

1750 births
1831 deaths
Fellows of the American Academy of Arts and Sciences
Hartford Wits
18th-century American poets
18th-century American male writers
American male poets
People from Watertown, Connecticut